The Buddhist Publication Society (BPS) is a publishing house with charitable status whose objective is to disseminate the teaching of Gautama Buddha. It was founded in Kandy, Sri Lanka in 1958 by two Sri Lankan lay Buddhists, A.S. Karunaratna and Richard Abeyasekera, and a European-born Buddhist monk, Nyanaponika Thera. Originally conceived as a limited effort to publish small, affordable books on fundamental Buddhist topics, the Society expanded in scope in response to the reception of their early publishing efforts. The Buddhist Publication society's publications reflect the perspective of the Theravada denomination of Buddhism, drawing heavily from the Pāli Canon for source material.

The BPS supplies Buddhist literature to over 3,000 subscriber members throughout 80 countries. Its titles have been translated into many languages, including German, French, Spanish, Portuguese, Czech, Hindi, and Chinese.

Publications 
The Buddhist Publication Society publishes a variety of works, in both English and Sinhala, ranging from introductory works to translations of technical philosophical texts. The Society publishes works by a number of noted Theravada monks and lay writers, including books by Nyanaponika Thera, Nyanatiloka Mahathera, Bhikkhu Bodhi, Piyadassi Thera, Soma Thera, Bhikkhu Ñanamoli, Nyanananda Thera, Narada Mahathera, Webu Sayadaw, Ledi Sayadaw, Mahasi Sayadaw, Sayadaw U Pandita, Ajahn Chah, Hammalawa Saddhatissa, Acharya Buddharakkhita, Buddhadasa Bhikkhu, Ayya Khema, Sīlācāra, Paul Dahlke, I. B. Horner, K.N. Jayatilleke, Y. Karunadasa, Helmuth Hecker, S. Dhammika and Francis Story.

The BPS's English-language publications fall into three classes: two series of booklets called The Wheel and Bodhi Leaves, and full-size books.

The Wheel consists of booklets issued in a format 4.8 x 7.2 inches, typically ranging from 40 to 80 pages. Since the inception of BPS in 1958, about 250 titles have been published, though not all have been maintained in print. The booklets cover a wide range of topics, including: specific Buddhist teachings (like the Four Nobles Truths), meditation and mind training,  Buddhist history and culture, translations from the Pali Canon, and non-canonical Buddhist literature. All Wheel Publications have been digitalised and are being reissued in bound volumes as well as put on the BPS website.

Bodhi Leaves is a series of smaller booklets, hand-sized, between 16 and 40 pages in length. Its range of categories is similar to that of the Wheel, but the tone is less expository and more conversational. This series was discontinued, but the issues are being made available in digital format on the BPS website.

The BPS's line of full-size books includes both basic introductions and advanced texts on Buddhist doctrine and practice. Bhikkhu Ñanamoli's The Life of the Buddha is the most popular title. The BPS also publishes translations of several small classics from the Pali Canon, including Achariya Buddharakkhita's The Dhammapada and The Udāna and the Itivuttaka, translated by John Ireland.

Over the years BPS has published several works by the Burmese scholar-monk Ledi Sayadaw. The Manual of the Supreme Man (Uttamapurisa Dipani) and the Manual of Light and the Path of Higher Knowledge (Alin Kyan and Vijjamagga Dipani) were published in book form.

In the late 1990s, the BPS entered into co-publication agreements with Wisdom Publications in Boston to make its works more readily available to readers in the Americas and Europe. The BPS also co-publishes works on Theravada Buddhism first issued by Western publishers to make them more easily available for Asian readers.

BPS has also partnered with Pariyatti, a U.S. publisher and bookseller affiliated with the Vipassana Research Academy. As well as distributing BPS books in the Americas, Pariyatti has created an imprint called BPS Pariyatti Editions (BPE) to publish American editions of The Path of Purification, A Comprehensive Manual of Abhidhamma, The Noble Eightfold Path and other popular BPS titles.

Since 1960, the BPS has been issuing a Sinhala-language counterpart of The Wheel called Damsak (= Dhamma-cakka), and a series of full-size books in Sinhala called Kalana Mithuru (= Kalyanamitra) Books. From 1960, Damsak was edited by the Sri Lankan missionary monk Piyadassi Thera. After his death in 1998, responsibility for the Sinhala publications was taken over by his assistant, A.G.S. Kariyawasam until his death in 2005. Currently, Mr. Senadheera is looking after the Sinhalese publications.

Dhamma Dana Project 
In 1993, the Society launched the Nyanaponika Dhamma Dana Project, named in honor of former Society president Nyanaponika Mahathera. Under the auspices of the project, 50–150 copies of each new book published by the society are sent free of charge to libraries, monasteries, and Buddhist centers around the world. Copies of the Wheel are also sent to Buddhist temples and practice centers, to be distributed free of charge.

Staff

Presidents 
 Nyanaponika Thera, 1958–1988
 Bhikkhu Bodhi, 1988–2010
 P.D. Premasiri, 2011–present

Editors 

 Nyanaponika Thera, 1958–1984
 Bhikkhu Bodhi, 1984–2002
 Bhikkhu Nyanatusita 2005–present

See also 
 Pali Canon
 Pali literature
 Pali Text Society
 Dhamma Society Fund
 Pariyatti (bookstore)
 Buddhist Cultural Centre
 Path Press
 The Buddhist (TV channel)
 Shraddha TV
 Global Buddhist Network
 Lord Buddha TV
 Access to Insight

References

External links 
 
 BPS Online Library
 Collected BPS publications at Access to Insight website

Buddhist charities
Charities based in Sri Lanka
Buddhist publishing companies
Religious organizations established in 1958
Publishing companies established in 1958
1958 establishments in Ceylon